Irena Malkiewicz (15 September 1911 – 23 January 2004) was a Polish actress. She appeared in more than 30 films and television shows between 1936 and 1988.

Selected filmography
 Serce matki (1939)
 Lotna (1959)
 Passenger (1963)

References

External links

1911 births	
2004 deaths
Polish film actresses
Actresses from Moscow